Rudbar Sara (also Romanized as Rūdbār Sarā) is a village in Khoshabar Rural District, in the Central District of Rezvanshahr County, Gilan Province, Iran. At the 2006 census, its population was 2,358, in 582 families.

References 

Populated places in Rezvanshahr County